The 1980–81 IHF Women's Cup Winners' Cup was the fifth edition of IHF's competition for European women's handball national cup champions. It was contested by 16 teams, two more than the previous edition.

1965 European Cup runner-up Spartacus Budapest defeated Bane Sekulić Sombor in the final to win its first European trophy, following the steps of Ferencvárosi TC as the second Hungarian team to win the Cup Winners' Cup.

Results

References

Women's EHF Cup Winners' Cup
1980 in handball
1981 in handball